Ukraine competed at the 2014 Summer Youth Olympics, in Nanjing, China from 16 August to 28 August 2014.

Archery

Ukraine qualified a female archer from its performance at the 2013 World Archery Youth Championships. Ukraine later qualified a male archer from its performance at the 2014 European Archery Youth Championships.

Individual

Team

Athletics

Ukraine qualified 14 athletes.

Qualification Legend: Q=Final A (medal); qB=Final B (non-medal); qC=Final C (non-medal); qD=Final D (non-medal); qE=Final E (non-medal)

Boys
Field Events

Girls
Track & road events

Field events

Badminton

Ukraine qualified two athletes based on the 2 May 2014 BWF Junior World Rankings.

Singles

Doubles

Beach volleyball

Ukraine qualified a boys' team from their performance at the 2014 CEV Youth Continental Cup Final.

Boxing

Ukraine qualified four boxers based on its performance at the 2014 AIBA Youth World Championships.

Boys

Girls

Canoeing

Ukraine qualified two boats based on its performance at the 2013 World Junior Canoe Sprint and Slalom Championships.

Boys

Girls

Cycling

Ukraine qualified a boys' and girls' team based on its ranking issued by the UCI.

Team

Mixed Relay

Diving

Ukraine qualified four quotas based on its performance at the Nanjing 2014 Diving Qualifying Event.

Fencing

Ukraine qualified one athlete based on its performance at the 2014 FIE Cadet World Championships.

Girls

Mixed Team

Gymnastics

Artistic Gymnastics

Ukraine qualified one athlete based on its performance at the 2014 European MAG Championships.

Boys

Rhythmic Gymnastics

Ukraine qualified one athlete based on its performance at the 2014 Rhythmic Gymnastics Grand Prix in Moscow.

Individual

Judo

Ukraine qualified two athletes based on its performance at the 2013 Cadet World Judo Championships.

Individual

Team

Modern Pentathlon

Ukraine qualified two athletes based on its performance at the 2014 Youth A World Championships.

Rowing

Ukraine qualified one boat based on its performance at the 2013 World Rowing Junior Championships.

Qualification Legend: FA=Final A (medal); FB=Final B (non-medal); FC=Final C (non-medal); FD=Final D (non-medal); SA/B=Semifinals A/B; SC/D=Semifinals C/D; R=Repechage

Sailing

Ukraine qualified one boat based on its performance at the Byte CII European Continental Qualifiers.

Shooting

Ukraine qualified three shooters based on its performance at the 2014 European Shooting Championships.

Individual

Team

Swimming

Ukraine qualified four swimmers.

Boys

Girls

Taekwondo

Ukraine qualified three athletes based on its performance at the Taekwondo Qualification Tournament.

Boys

Girls

Tennis

Ukraine qualified one athlete based on the 9 June 2014 ITF World Junior Rankings.

Singles

Doubles

Triathlon

Ukraine qualified one athlete based on its performance at the 2014 European Youth Olympic Games Qualifier.

Individual

Relay

Weightlifting

Ukraine qualified 1 quota in the boys' and girls' events based on the team ranking after the 2013 Weightlifting Youth World Championships.

Boys

Girls

Wrestling

Ukraine qualified two athletes based on its performance at the 2014 European Cadet Championships.

Boys

Girls

References

2014 in Ukrainian sport
Nations at the 2014 Summer Youth Olympics
2014